= Hotan Silk Factory =

Silk factory in Xinjiang, China

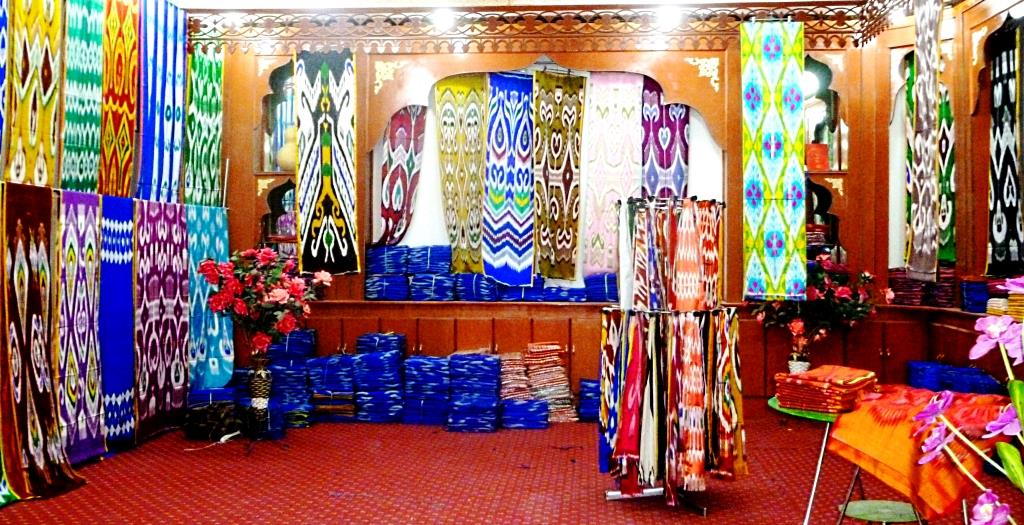
Khotanese silks showing traditional patterns. Khotan, Xinjiang, China

The Hotan Silk Factory (Chinese: 和田丝绸厂; pinyin: Hétián Sīchóu Chǎng; lit. 'Hetian Silk Factory') is a silk factory in Hotan, Xinjiang, China. It is located to the northeast of the town of Hotan and manufactures many colorful silks which are sold in market. The factory offers tours in Chinese of the silk-making process, from the boiling of the cocoons to the printing of the silk.
